Great Scott!! is an album by American jazz organist Shirley Scott recorded in 1964 for the Impulse! label.

Reception
The Allmusic review awarded the album 4½ stars.

Track listing
All compositions by Shirley Scott except as indicated

 "A Shot in the Dark" (Henry Mancini) - 3:15
 "Great Scott" (Bob Hammer) - 2:30
 "The Seventh Dawn" - 3:53
 "Hoe Down" (Oliver Nelson) - 3:36
 "Shadows of Paris" (Mancini) - 2:23
 "Five O'Clock Whistle" (Kim Gannon, Gene Irwin, Josef Myrow) - 2:57
 "The Blues Ain't Nothin' But Some Pain" - 4:59
 "I'm Getting Sentimental Over You" (George Bassman, Ned Washington) - 3:22
 "Make Someone Happy" (Betty Comden, Adolph Green, Jule Styne) - 6:44

Recorded on May 14 (tracks 6-9) and May 20 (tracks 1-5), 1964.

Personnel
Shirley Scott — organ, vocals 
Jerry Kail, Jimmy Nottingham, Joe Wilder, Snooky Young — trumpet  (tracks 1-5)
Willie Dennis, Urbie Green, Quentin Jackson, Tony Struda — trombone  (tracks 1-5)
Bob Ashton, Romeo Penque — reeds  (tracks 1-5)
Barry Galbraith — guitar (tracks 1-5)  
Bob Cranshaw (tracks 6-9), George Duvivier (tracks 1-5) — bass
Otis Finch — drums (tracks 6-9)
Osie Johnson, Johnny Pacheco, Willie Rodriguez — percussion (tracks 1-5)
Lillian Clark, Jerry Graff - vocals (track 5)
Oliver Nelson — arranger, conductor (tracks 1-5)

References

Impulse! Records albums
Albums arranged by Oliver Nelson
Albums produced by Bob Thiele
Shirley Scott albums
1964 albums
Albums conducted by Oliver Nelson